Vincent Riou (born 9 January 1972, Pont-l'Abbé, France) is a French sailor. He is the skipper of PRB, a 60-foot monohull. He won the 2004 edition of the Vendée Globe.

Recent events
As part of his introduction to solo racing he helped prepared Michel Desjoyeaux’s 60-foot PRB for the 2000 edition of the Vendée Globe.

In the 2008 Vendée Globe, he lost his mast the day after a collision that occurred during the rescue of Jean Le Cam, whose boat had capsized.

In the 2016 Vendée Globe, he sailed at a decent speed completing with front boats fitted with hydrofoils, but after 15 days 11 hours  58 minutes of racing and completing 27% of the whole race, he was forced to retire after another collision with a UFO. The almost exact same incident had happened to Vincent in the 2012–2013 Vendée Globe with that he is easily one of the most unfortunate sailors of the Vendée Globe.

Honours 

 2nd 1992  Challenge Credit Agricole
 1st 2003 Calais Round Britain Race
 1st 2004 Vendée Globe
 1st 2007 Calais Round Britain Race
 1st 2007 Rolex RORC Fastnet Race
 3rd 2008 Vendée Globe
 DNF 2012 Vendée Globe
 DNF 2016 Vendée Globe

References

1972 births
Living people
People from Pont-l'Abbé
French sailors
Vendée Globe finishers
Sportspeople from Finistère
French male sailors (sport)
IMOCA 60 class sailors
French Vendee Globe sailors
2004 Vendee Globe sailors
2008 Vendee Globe sailors
2012 Vendee Globe sailors
2016 Vendee Globe sailors